Lauren Davis was the defending champion, but lost in the quarterfinals.

Heather Watson won the tournament, defeating Ksenia Pervak in the final, 6–4, 6–0.

Seeds

Main draw

Finals

Top half

Bottom half

External Links
 Main draw

Dow Corning Tennis Classic - Singles
Dow Corning Tennis Classic